Seoksu-dong (석수동, 石水洞) is a neighborhood of Manan district in the city of Anyang, Gyeonggi Province, South Korea. It is officially divided into Seoksu-1-dong, Seoksu-2-dong, and Seoksu-3-dong.

External links 
 Seoksu-1-dong 
 Seoksu-2-dong 
 Seoksu-3-dong 

Manan-gu
Neighbourhoods in Anyang, Gyeonggi